The following is a list of Mississippi Landmarks officially nominated by the Mississippi Department of Archives and History and approved by each county's chancery clerk. The Mississippi Landmark designation is the highest form of recognition bestowed on properties by the state of Mississippi, and designated properties are protected from changes that may alter the property's historic character. Currently there are 890 designated landmarks in the state.

These landmarks are spread out between eighty-one of Mississippi's eighty-two counties; only Issaquena County has no such landmarks.



In October 2011, the Mississippi Department of Archives and History removed the .pdf listing from its website, adding a searchable database that is kept up-to-date as new landmarks are designated. This database contains information about many historic buildings in Mississippi, but to return a list of designated Mississippi Landmarks, click the "MS Landmarks" link and enter desired city or county.

Following are the properties listed as landmarks by the Mississippi Department of Archives and History as of August 2009.

Adams
Adams County Courthouse
Adams County Jail
Assembly Hall
Auburn 
Carmel Presbyterian Church
Carpenter School No. 1
Carpenter School No. 2
Neibert-Fisk House
Britton & Koontz National Bank
Brumfield High School
Commercial Building
Glencannon (also Glenfield) 
Grand Village of the Natchez
House on Ellicott's Hill
Illinois Central Railroad Freight Depot 
Jefferson College
East Wing
President's House
West Wing
William Johnson House
Laurel Hill Plantation
Billiard Hall
Carriage House
Crypt
Eastern Dependency
Parsonage
St. Mary's Chapel
Western Dependency
Longwood
Henderson-Britton House (also Magnolia Hall)
Margaret Martin High School (also Old Natchez High School)
Institute Hall (also Memorial Hall)
James Andrews House
Lawyer's Lodge
Linton House
Monmouth
NAPAC Museum (also Old U.S. Post Office)
Natchez Bluffs and Under-the-Hill Historic District
Little Mexico Property
Natchez City Park (also The Esplanade)
Natchez City Hall
Natchez College
Huddleston Memorial Chapel
Women's Auxiliary Building
Natchez Institute
Prince Street School
Sadie V. Thompson School
Selma Plantation House
Smart-Griffin House (also Angeletty House)
Stanton Hall
Palestine Road Sites
Presbyterian Manse (also The Manse) 
Temple B'nai Israel
Washington Blocks 4 and 5

Alcorn
Corinth Clothing Manufacturing Company Building
Alcorn County Courthouse
B.F. Liddon House
Civil War Battlefield Properties
Bell Property
Briggs Property
Brooks Property
Burns Property
Corona Female College
James Crabb Property
Ruby Lee Crabb Property
Derrick Property
David Essary Property
Dwayne Essary Property
Gerald Essary Property
Ginn Property
Glisson Property
Goodrum Property
Griffin Property
Johnson Property
Kanady Property
Rowland Property
Steen Property
Voyles Property
Wilbanks Property
William H. Davis Jr. Property
Clinton Robert Whitaker Property (also Theresa Christine Whitaker Madlinger Property)
Coliseum Theatre
Corinth Battlefield
Union Battery F
Battery Robinette
Union Siege Lines (Sherman & Davies)
Corinth Depot
Corinth Junior High School
Liddon Building (405 Cruise St)
Liddon Building (407 Cruise St)
Liddon Building (409 Cruise St)
Glendale School
Glendale School Gymnasium
Teacher's House (Glendale School)
Jacinto Courthouse
Jacinto Doctor's Office
Veranda House (also Curlee House)

Amite
Amite County Courthouse
Confederate Monument
Amite Female Seminary

Attala
Attala County Courthouse
Kosciuscko City Hall (also Old U.S. Post Office)
Mary Ricks Thornton Cultural Center (also Old First Presbyterian Church)

Benton
Benton County Courthouse

Bolivar
Amzie Moore House
Bolivar County Courthouse (701 Main St)
Bolivar County Courthouse (200 Court St South)
Cleveland Police Department (also U.S. Post Office)
Dedwyler Memorial Building (also Bolivar County Health Department)
Delta State University
Bailey Hall
Broom Hall
Cleveland Hall
Faculty House
Fielding Wright Art Center
Old President's House
Ward Hall
Whitfield Gymasium
I. T. Montgomery House
Lake Beulah Berm
Mound Bayou Bank
Old Municipal Building and Masonic Hall (also Shelby Lodge No. 478)
Rhodes Printing Company (also Ellis Theater)
Rosedale City Hall
Shelby Depot
Taborian Hospital
West Bolivar High School

Calhoun
E.L. Bruce Company General Store
New Liberty School
West Mound

Carroll
Carroll County Courthouse
Old Carroll County Courthouse
Old Carroll County Jail
Carrollton Community House
Carrollton Livery Stable
Carrollton Town Hall
Classroom Building, Black Hawk School
Loving-Bingham-Gee House
Masonic Hall (also Carrollton Lodge No. 36)
Stanhope
Vaiden School Complex
R.C. Weir Memorial Building (also Administration Building)
Vocational Building
Vance Hotel

Chickasaw
Old Houlka School
Administration Building
Chickasaw County Courthouse (Mississippi)
Civil War Battlefield Properties
Davis Property
Mississippi Hills Property
Houston Carnegie Library
Okolona Carnegie Library
Okolona College
Okolona Hall
Bratton Hall (also T.D. Bratton Memorial Dormitory)
Gazebo
McDougall Hall
Vocational Agriculture Building
R.W. Chandler House

Choctaw
Choctaw County Courthouse
Pinnix Hotel (also Cochran Hotel)

Claiborne
Alcorn State University
Belles Lettres Building
Dormitory No. 2
Dormitory No. 3
Harmon Hall
Lanier Hall
Oakland Chapel
President's House
Rowan Administration Building
Bernheimer Building
Chamberlin-Hunt-Guthrie Hall
Claiborne County Courthouse
Samuel Gibson House
Grand Gulf Military State Park
Grand Gulf Military Park Cemetery
Confederate Memorial Chapel (also Sacred Heart Catholic Church)
Superintendent's House
Wheeless House
Harriette Person Memorial Library
Irwin Russell Memorial Building (also Port Gibson City Hall)
Mississippi National Bank Building
Port Gibson Battlefield
Shaifer House
Shaifer Road
Temple Gemiluth Chassed
Value Mart Building (also Meyer-Mark Building)
Widow's Creek Bridge
Windsor Ruins

Clarke
Chunky River Bridge
Clarke County Courthouse
Enterprise Bridge
Quitman Depot
Shubuta Bridge

Clay
Brogan Mound and Village Site
Administration Building
Eutaw Site
Northside School (also West Point Colored High School and Fifth Street School)
Tibbee Bridge
West Clay Agricultural High School
Classroom Building
Teacherage
West Point City Hall
West Point Depot
West Point Police Station (also Old U.S. Post Office)
West Point School

Coahoma
Bobo High School (also Old Clarksdale High School)
Civic Auditorium
Clarksdale Carnegie Public Library
Clarksdale City Hall
Clarksdale Freight Depot (also Delta Blues Museum)
Clarksdale Passenger Depot
Coahoma Community College
Tiny Tiger Daycare Center
J.W. Cutrer House
Old Greyhound Bus Station
Larry Thompson Center for the Fine Arts (also Paramount Theater)
Yazoo-Mississippi Delta Levee Board Building

Copiah
Copiah County Courthouse
Copiah-Lincoln Community College
J.M. Ewing Administration Building
Gatesville Bridge
Illinois Central Depot
Homochitto River Bridge
Masonic Hall (also Golden Square Lodge No. 88)
Mount Hope
Rockport Bridge
Old Wesson Public School
William H. Holtzclaw House

Covington
Covington County Courthouse

De Soto
B.F. Wesson House
De Soto County Courthouse
Felix Labauve House
Old Hickahala Creek Bridge

Forrest
Administration Building (Jefferson Davis Elementary School)
Administration Building (F.B. Woodley Elementary School)
Administration Building (Forrest County Agricultural High School)
Burkett's Creek Archeological Site
Camp Shelby
Building 1071
Building 6981
Dr. J.J. Bethea House
East Forrest High School (also Leaf River High School)
East Sixth Street USO Building
Eaton Elementary School (also NRHP-listed)
Eureka School
Old Federal Building and Post Office
Forrest County Courthouse
Hattiesburg City Hall
Old Hattiesburg High School
Hattiesburg Public Library
Hawkins Jr. High School
Masonic Temple (also Hattiesburg Lodge No. 397)
Saenger Theatre
Union Station
University of Southern Mississippi
Print Center
Administration Building
Alumni House
Bennett Auditorium
College Hall
Forrest County Hall
Hattiesburg Hall
Honor House
Mississippi Hall
Southern Hall
Walthall School (also Court Street School)

Franklin
Bude Depot
Eddiceton Bridge
Franklin County Courthouse

George
George County Courthouse
Lucedale Schoolhouse
Merrill Bridge (also Pascagoula River Bridge)
Oak Grove Community Center (also Lucedale Colored School)

Greene
Greene County Courthouse
Leaf River Bridge
State Line School
Vernal Community Center

Grenada
Belle Flower Missionary Baptist Church
Chapel Hill United Methodist Church
Grenada Bank
Old U.S. Post Office
Masonic Temple (also Grenada Lodge No. 31)
Odd Fellows Cemetery and Confederate Cemetery
Wild Wings Mounds

Hancock
Jackson Landing Site (Mulatto Bayou)
Jackson Landing Site A
Bay St. Louis City Hall
Bay St. Louis Depot
Old Bay St. Louis High School
Gulfview School
Hancock County Courthouse
Hancock County Jail
Waveland Civic Center (also Old Waveland Elementary School)
Webb School

Harrison
Beauvoir
Confederate Cemetery
Confederate Veterans Home Dormitories (non-extant)
Confederate Veterans Home Hospital (non-extant)
Hayes Cottage (non-extant)
Beauvoir Library (non-extant)
Manager's House (Beauvoir) (non-extant)
Biloxi City Hall (also Old U.S. Post Office, Courthouse, and Customhouse)
Biloxi Lighthouse
Biloxi Visitors Center (also Paul W. Brielmaier House) [Destroyed by Hurricane Katrina, August 29, 2005]
Creole Cottage (also First Biloxi Library)
G.B. Dantzler House (also Robinson-Maloney House) [Destroyed by Hurricane Katrina, August 29, 2005] 
Dr. Hiram A. Roberts House (also Joseph William Milner House and Grasslawn)
Fisherman's Cottage
Gillis House [Destroyed by Hurricane Katrina, August 29, 2005]
Glenn L. Swetman House
Grasslawn II
Gulf Coast Center for the Arts (also Old Biloxi Public Library)
Gulfport Army Air Field Hangar
Gulfport City Hall
Gulfport Firehouse No. 4
Gulfport–Harrison County Library
Old Gulfport High School
Gulfport Veterans Administration Medical Center
Building 1—Main Medical Building
Building 2—Kitchen and dining hall
Building 3—Ward B
Building 4—Ward C
Building 5—Ward D
Building 41—Infirmary
Building 57—Hospital building
Building 62—Ward G
Building 63—Chapel
Building 64—Administration Building
Old Harrison County Circuit Clerk's Office [Destroyed by Hurricane Katrina, August 29, 2005]
Gulfport Depot (also Gulfport Centennial Museum)
Magnolia Hotel
Maritime and Seafood Industry Museum (also U.S. Coast Guard Barracks)
Masonic Hall (Long Beach, Mississippi)
Mississippi Sound Historical Museum (also Gulfport Carnegie Library)
Old Brick House (Biloxi, Mississippi), also known as Biloxi Garden Center
Old Pass Christian High School
Old Pass Christian Middle School (also Old J.W. Randolph School)
Pleasant Reed House
Saenger Theater
Soria City School
Town Library [Destroyed by Hurricane Katrina, August 29, 2005] 
Tullis-Toledano
Crawford House [Destroyed by Hurricane Katrina, August 29, 2005] 
Tullis Manor (also Philbrick House, Pradat House, and Tullis-Toledano House)
W.J. Quarles House and Cottage

Hinds
Alamo Theatre
Ayer Hall
Bailey Hill Civil War Earthworks
Bailey Magnet School (also Bailey Junior High School)
J.H. Boyd House (also The Oaks)
Old Bridgeport Road Segment
Byram Bridge
Capri Theater (also Pix Theater)
Castle Crest (also Merrill-Sanders-Holman House)
John F. Cates House
Central High School
Central Fire Station
Chambliss Building
Chapel of Greater Mount Calvary Baptist Church (also Our Redeemer Evangelical Lutheran Church)
City Mound
Civil War Battlefield Properties
McGavock's Hill
R&B Land Company Property
COFO Building
Commercial Building (1011 Lynch Street)
Commercial Building (1013 Lynch Street)
Coker House
Lorena Duling School
Elks Building (also Jackson Lodge No. 416)
Eudora Welty House
Medgar and Myrlie Evers Home National Monument
Former First Christian Church
Flannegan-Lowry House (also Hart-Lowry-Hull-Sands House)
Fortenberry-Parkman House and Farmstead (also Agriculture and Forestry Museum)
French Merci Train Boxcar
Governor's Mansion
Garner Wynn Green House
Greenwood Cemetery
Heber Ladner Building (also Mississippi Title Insurance Company and Mississippi Baptist Convention Headquarters)
Hinds County Armory
Hinds County Courthouse (401 Pascagoula St)
Hinds County Courthouse (127 Main St W)
J.Z. George Elementary School
Jackson City Hall
Former Jackson Municipal Library
Jackson Water Works Filter Building and Pump No. 1
Jackson Zoological Park
Jefferson Davis School
King Edward Hotel
Lake House
Lanier High School
Ervin Lewis House
Livingston Park
Main Hall (Hinds Community College)
Manship House
Masonic Temple (also Stringer Grand Lodge)
Merchants Company Warehouse
Mississippi River Basin Model Waterways Experiment Station
Mississippi Federation of Women's Clubs Headquarters
Naval and Marine Corps Reserve Center
Mississippi State Capitol
Jackson Depot
Old Mississippi State Capitol
Old Capitol Green
Ollie M. Bradley Elementary School
Pocahontas Mound A
Poindexter Elementary School
Poindexter Park
Old Robert E. Lee School
Robert E. Lee Hotel
Scott Ford House Complex
Mary Green Scott House
Scott Ford House (also Lula Ford House)
Smith Robertson School
Spanish–American War Monument
Standard Life Building (also Tower Building)
Terminal Building, Hawkins Field
Union Station
W.W. Westbrook House
War Memorial Building
Water Tower
Watkins Elementary School (also Liberty Grove School)
Welty House Visitor's Center (also Armstrong House)
William Howard Walton Elementary School
Woodrow Wilson Bridge

Holmes
Acona School
Alexander Brock Store
Holmes County Records Building
Confederate Monument
Durant School
Emory United Methodist Church
Holmes County State Park
Holmes County State Park Cabin No. 1
Holmes County State Park Cabin No. 2
Holmes County State Park Cabin No. 3
Holmes County State Park Cabin No. 4
Holmes County State Park Cabin No. 5
Holmes County State Park Cabin No. 6
Holmes County State Park Park Manager's Residence
Holmes County Courthouse
Holmes County Jail
Masonic Temple (also Lexington Lodge No. 24)
Providence Mound
T & T Building (also Strand Theater)
West Methodist Church

Humphreys
Humphreys County Courthouse
Jaketown Site – Tract 1
Jaketown Site – Tract 2

Itawamba
Carolina Consolidated School
Fulton Grammar School
Oakland School

Jackson
Armstrong-Weider Cottage
Gautier Elementary School
Louisville and Nashville Railroad Depot at Ocean Springs
Mary C. O'Keefe Cultural Center (also Ocean Springs Community Center)
Mississippi Federation of Women's Clubs
Old Ocean Springs High School
Ocean Springs Senior Citizens Center
Old Spanish Fort (De La Pointe-Krebs House)
Knights of Columbus Hall (Pascagoula, Mississippi), aka Krebs House
Louisville and Nashville Railroad Depot at Pascagoula
Old Pascagoula High School
Round Island Lighthouse (Pascagoula, Mississippi)
Walter Anderson Cottage

Jasper
Old Jasper County Jail
Montrose Presbyterian Church

Jefferson
Jefferson County High School (also Old Fayette High School)
Mt. Zion Baptist Church No. 1
Old Hill Place Bridge
Rosswood
Wagner's Store
Youngblood Bridge

Jefferson Davis
Jefferson Davis County Courthouse
Prentiss Institute Administration Building
Stephen H. Wilkes House

Jones
Amos Deason House
Old George S. Gardiner High School
Hatten School
Jones County Courthouse (Laurel)
Jones County Courthouse (Ellisville)
Lamar Elementary School
Laurel City Hall
Laurel Depot
Stewart M. Jones Junior High School

Kemper
Kemper County Courthouse

Lafayette
Cedar Oaks
Lucius Quintus Cincinnatus Lamar House
Lafayette County Courthouse
Oxford City Hall (also Old U.S. Post Office and Federal Building
Oxford Depot
Old Power Plant
Price-Crawford House (also Washington Price House)
Stark Young House (also Walton-Young House)
The Belfry
University of Mississippi
University House
Bondurant Hall
Chemistry Building
Farley Hall (also Lamar Hall)
Bryant Hall
Fulton Turner Hall (also Fulton Chapel)
Lyceum Building
McCain Hall
Peabody Hall
Ventress Hall
Y.M.C.A. Building
William Faulkner House (also Rowan Oak)

Lamar
Lamar County Courthouse
Old Municipal Courtroom and Jail

Lauderdale
Dement House
Grand Opera House
Highland Park
Highland Park Dentzel Carousel and Shelter Building
Lauderdale County Courthouse
Lauderdale County Courthouse Annex (also Lamar Hotel)
Marks-Rothenberg Building
Mattye Hersee Hospital
Meridian Museum of Art
Meridian Water Works
Merrehope
Meridian City Hall
Newberry Building
Oakes-Bonita I Site
Union Station R.E.A. Building
Ross's Storage Building
S.H. Kress & Co.
Soulé Steam Feed Works (402 19th Ave)
Soulé Steam Feed Works (1809 5th St)
Soulé Steam Feed Works (1806 4th St)
Soulé Steam Feed Works (1808 4th St)
Soulé Steam Feed Works (1803–1805 5th St)
Stevenson Primary School
Stuckey's Bridge
Threefoot Building
Ulmer Building
Wechsler School
Frank W. Williams House
Witherspoon School (also East End School)

Lawrence
Armstrong-Lee House
Bahala Creek Bridge
Monticello Depot
Lawrence County Courthouse
Old Monticello Consolidate School
Pretty Branch Bridge
White Sand Creek Bridge

Leake
Carthage Elementary School
Leake County Courthouse

Lee
Church Street Elementary School (also North Church Primary School)
Civil War Battlefield Properties
Carpenter Property
Duvall Property
Epting Property
Bill Hardy Property
Leslie Property
Elvis Presley Birthplace
Lee County Road 681
Lee County Courthouse
Tombigbee State Park

Leflore
Columbus and Greenville Railroad Passenger Depot
Confederate Memorial Building
Davis Elementary School (also Old Greenwood High School)
Elks Club (also Greenwood Lodge No. 854)
Old Fire Station No. 1 (also Red Cross Building)
Old Greenwood Leflore Library
Greenwood Public Schools Administration Building (also Old U.S. Post Office)
Itta Bena City Hall
Keesler Bridge
Leflore County Courthouse

Lincoln
Brookhaven City Hall
Brookhaven High School
Cedar Hills Farms
Haven Theater
Henry Strong House
Union Station
Whitworth College
Cooper Hall
Elizabeth Cottage
Enoch Hall
Johnson Institute
Whitworth College Laundry Building
Mary Jane Lampton Auditorium
Y.W.C.A. Building

Lowndes
Stephen D. Lee House (also Blewett-Harrison-Lee House)
Caledonia Presbyterian Church
Columbus City Fire Department Storage
Columbus and Greenville Locomotive No. 178
Columbus Bridge (also Old Highway 82 Bridge)
Columbus City Hall
Columbus Light and Water Building (also U.S. Post Office)
Commercial Building
Franklin Academy Elementary School
Friendship Cemetery
Lowndes County Courthouse
McGahey Building
Merchants and Farmers Bank
Motley Slough Bridge
Mississippi University for Women
Callaway Hall
Columbus Hall
Demonstration School
Eckford Building (also Eckford Nursery)
Eudora Welty Hall (also Fant Building)
Franklin Hall
Grossnickle Hall
Hastings-Simmons Hall
Mabel Fant Hall
Martin Hall
Mary Wilson House
McDevitt Hall
Orr Building
Painter Hall
Peyton Hall
Plant Engineering Building (also J. M. Barrow Memorial School)
Pohl Recreation Building (also Pohl Gymnasium)
Poindexter Hall
Reneau Hall
South Callaway Hall
Stovall House
W. N. Puckett House
Whitfield Hall (also Whitfield Auditorium)
Police Department
Old St. Paul's Episcopal Church Rectory (also Tennessee Williams House)
Temple Heights (also Brownrigg-Harris-Kennebrew House)

Madison
Allison's Wells School of Arts and Crafts (also Conwell Hotel and Trolio Hotel)
Canton Depot
Canton High School
Commercial Building (Canton, Mississippi)
Flora Depot
Haley Cemetery (also Puckshunubbee Site)
James Restaurant Building
Kirkwood Cemetery
Little Sulm Building
Madison Airport World War II Aircraft Hangars (also Mississippi Institute of Aeronautics Aircraft Hangars)
Madison County Chancery Court Building
Old U.S. Post Office
Madison County Courthouse
Madison-Ridgeland Public School
Madison-Ridgeland School Gymnasium
Molony's Building
Old Agency Road
Sulm Building
Brownee Hall

Marion
Columbia High School
Columbia Water Works
John Ford House
Marion County Jail
Marion County Courthouse and Jail
Rankin Company Buildings
Rankin Company Building (also Columbia Assembler, Inc.)
Rankin Grocery Warehouse
Mississippi Industrial and Training School Superintendent's House

Marshall
Bessie Jones House
Bolling-Gatewood House (also Ida B. Wells Museum)
Byhalia High School
Chalmers Institute
Church of the Yellow Fever Martyrs (also Old St. Joseph's Catholic Church)
First Presbyterian Church
Holly Springs City Hall
Holly Springs Insurance Office
Marshall County Courthouse
Marshall County Historical Society and Museum (also Mississippi Synodical College)
Mississippi Industrial College
Carnegie Auditorium
Catherine Hall
Davis Hall
Hammond Hall
Washington Hall
Montrose
Holly Springs Police Department
Wall Doxey State Park
Wall Doxey Bath House
Wall Doxey State Park Cabin No. 3
Wall Doxey State Park Landscape Features
Wall Doxey State Park Lodge

Monroe
Aberdeen City Hall
Amory City Hall
Amory Regional Museum (also Gilmore Sanitarium)
Athens Jail (also Monroe County Jail)
Gregg-Hamilton House (also Mary Francis Gregg House)
Aberdeen Depot
Monroe County Courthouse
National Guard Armory
Reuben Davis House (also Sunset Hill)
Rosemont (Mississippi) (also Hale House)
The Magnolias (also W. B. Walker House and William Alfred Sykes House)
Old U.S. Post Office and Federal Building
W. W. Watkins House

Montgomery
Elk Horn School
Immanuel Episcopal Church
Winona Community House

Neshoba
Neshoba County Courthouse
Philadelphia Depot
Philadelphia Police Department (also Old U.S. Post Office)

Newton
Alabama and Vicksburg Railroad Depot
Boler's Inn
C. H. Boler School
Lawrence Consolidated School
Mcelroy-Hoye House
Newton City Hall

Noxubee
Macon Elementary School
Macon City Hall
Noxubee County Courthouse
Noxubee County Library (also Old Noxubee County Jail)
Noxubee County Offices (also Old Noxubee County Jail of 1870)
Running Water Creek Bridge
Dancing Rabbit Creek Treaty Site

Oktibbeha
Starkville City Hall
Greensboro Center (also Old Starkville High School)
Magruder-Newsom House
Mississippi State University
Bowen Hall
Carpenter Engineering Building
E. E. Cooley Building (also J. M. Stone Cotton Mill)
George Hall
Harned Hall
Herbert Hall
Hull Hall
Industrial Education Building
Lee Hall
Lloyd-Ricks Hall
Magruder Hall
McCain Engineering Building
Middleton ROTC Building
Montgomery Hall
Perry Cafeteria
Power Plant
Stennis Center (also Starkville Depot)
Y.M.C.A. Building
Ritchie-Bunch House
Sturgis School

Panola
Batesville Elementary School (also Old Batesville High School)
Batesville Mounds
Heflin House
Popular Price Store
St. Stephen's Episcopal Church

Pearl River
Bertie Rouse School (also East Side Public School)
Buck Branch School
McNeil Consolidated School (also Pearl River Central Elementary)
Pearl River Community College
Pearl River Community College Alumni House
Huff Hall
Shivers Gymnasium
Pearl River County Courthouse
Picayune City Hall
Crosby Arboretum Pinecone Pavilion

Perry
Old Augusta Townsite
Runnelstown School Gymnasium
Mahned Bridge (also Leaf River Bridge)
Perry County Courthouse
Old Perry County Jail

Pike
Bacot-Manning House
Edgewood Park
Illinois Central Caboose No. 9384
McComb Edgewater Park Locomotive Engine and Refrigerator Car
Fire Station No. 1
Illinois Central Refrigerator Car No. 51000
Magnolia Depot
McComb City Hall
McComb Depot
McComb Public Library (also Old U.S. Post Office)
Percy Quin State Park
Percy Quin State Park Manager's House
CCC Cabins
CCC Lodge
Pike County Chancery Clerk's Office
Pike County Courthouse
White-Alford House

Pontotoc
Pontotoc Cemetery
Pontotoc Community House
Pontotoc County Courthouse
Old U.S. Post Office
ECRU School Vocational Building

Prentiss
Booneville Depot
Old Burton School
Old U.S. Post Office
Civil War Battlefield Properties
Griffin-Davis Property
Bill Hardy Property
Hoyle Palmer Property
Marietta Springs
Old Masonic Hall (also Booneville Lodge No. 303)
Prentiss County Courthouse

Quitman
Quitman County Courthouse

Rankin
Mississippi State Hospital Administration Building
Armstrong Site
Brandon Cemetery
Pelahatchie City Hall and Masonic Hall
Rankin County Courthouse
Hebron Academy aka Rock Hill School

Scott
Lake Depot
Roosevelt State Park

Sharkey
Leist Site A
Sharkey County Courthouse

Simpson
Boswell Center (also Mississippi State Sanatorium)
Simpson County Courthouse

Smith
Smith County Courthouse
Taylorsville Signal Office and Watkins General Store

Stone
Mississippi Gulf Coast Community College
Harrison Hall
Stone County Courthouse
Wiggins Depot

Sunflower
East Moorhead Elementary School Classroom Building
Moorhead Depot
Woodburn Bridge

Tallahatchie
Lamb-Fish Bridge
Tallahatchie County Second District Courthouse

Tate
Northwest Mississippi Community College Administration Building
Senatobia High School
Tate County Courthouse

Tippah
Tippah County Confederate Monument
Tippah County Courthouse
Tippah County Jail

Tishomingo
Civil War Battlefield Properties
Chaffin Property
Childers Property
Hubbard Property
Midway School
Tishomingo County Courthouse
Tishomingo State Park
Tishomingo State Park Cabin No. 1
Tishomingo State Park Cabin No. 2
Tishomingo State Park Cabin No. 3
Tishomingo State Park Cabin No. 4
Tishomingo State Park Cabin No. 5
Tishomingo State Park Cabin No. 6
Tishomingo State Park Comfort Station
Tishomingo State Park Group Cabin No. 1
Tishomingo State Park Group Cabin No. 2
Tishomingo State Park Group Cabin No. 3
Tishomingo State Park Group Cabin No. 5
Tishomingo State Park Group Cabin No. 6
Tishomingo State Park Lodge
Tishomingo State Park Main Office
Tishomingo State Park Picnic Pavilion
Tishomingo State Park Pool House and Swimming Pool
Tishomingo State Park Staff Residence
Tishomingo State Park Swinging Bridge
Tishomingo State Park Vehicular Bridge

Tunica
Hollywood Site
Tunica School
Tunica County Courthouse
Tunica County Jail
Tunica County Penal Farm Building

Union
Cine Theater
Civil War Battlefield Properties
Hoyle Palmer Property
Ingomar Mound
Merle Norman Building
New Albany City Hall
Old U.S. Post Office
Union County Courthouse

Walthall
Walthall County Courthouse

Warren
Balfour House
Bethel African Methodist Episcopal Church
Bowmar Avenue Elementary School
Carr Junior High School
Vicksburg Central Fire Station
Cherry Street Bridge
Christ Church
Confederate Avenue Brick Arch Bridge
Old Constitution Firehouse
Vicksburg Fire Station No. 7
Keystone Bridge Company Bridge (also Fairground Street Bridge
B'nai B'rith Club
Levee Street Station
McRae Bank (also Canizaro House)
Old Mississippi River Bridge
Planters Hall
Planters Hall Carriage House and Stable
Planters Hall Slave Quarters
Vicksburg Sears Department Store
Shlenker House (also Rig Perry House)
Sisters of Mercy Convent (also St. Francis Xavier Complex and Southern Cultural Heritage Complex)
Old St. Francis Xavier School
Cobb House
O'Beirne Gymnasium
St. Francis Xavier Elementary School
Vicksburg City Hall
Vicksburg Public Library
Old Warren County Courthouse
Warren County Courthouse
Warren County Jail
William Bodley House (also Plain Gables)

Washington
Bessie J. Taylor Nurses Home
Carrie Stern Elementary School
E. E. Bass School
Old Greenville High School
E. E. Bass Junior High School
Old Elks Club (also Greenville Lodge No. 148)
Greenville Fire Station No. 1
First National Bank Building
Fort Nicholson
Greenville City Hall
Leland City Hall
Levee Board Building
Rattlesnake Bayoue and Levee
Washington County Courthouse
Wetherbee House
Winterville Mounds

Wayne
Wayne County Courthouse
Waynesboro Bridge
Yellow Creek Bridge

Webster
Eupora School Administration Building
Eupora Community House
Eupora Depot
Eupora School Gymnasium
Webster County Courthouse
Webster County Jail
Wood Home for Boys

Wilkinson
Ash Hardware Building
Marsalis Building (also Centreville-Camp Van Dorm Museum)
Wilkinson County Courthouse
Wilkinson County Jail
Wilkinson County Museum
Woodville African American Cultural Center
Woodville Depot
Old Woodville Graded School
Woodville Town Hall

Winston
Legion State Park
Legion State Park Lodge
Old Masonic Hall (also Louisville Lodge No. 75)
Strand Theater
Winston County Library

Yalobusha
Pine Valley School
Yalobusha County First District Courthouse
Yalobusha County Second District Courthouse
Yalobusha County Jail

Yazoo
Afro-American Sons and Daughters Hospital
Casey Jones Museum
Hotel Lamar
A. J. Oakes House
Penny-Pepper House
Ricks Memorial Library
Triangle Cultural Center
Yazoo City City Hall
Yazoo County Courthouse

See also
National Register of Historic Places listings in Mississippi
List of National Historic Landmarks in Mississippi

References

External links
Mississippi Department of Archives and History
Lost Mississippi Landmarks

Landmarks
Lists of landmarks